Selago lepida is a species of plant in the family Scrophulariaceae. It is endemic to Namibia.  Its natural habitats are subtropical or tropical dry shrubland and rocky areas. It is threatened by habitat loss.

References

Endemic flora of Namibia
lepida
Least concern plants
Taxonomy articles created by Polbot